McCrory is a surname. It is derived from the Irish and Scottish Gaelic surname Mac Ruaidhrí.

People with the surname

Ann McCrory (born 1956), former First Lady of North Carolina, former First Lady of Charlotte, North Carolina
Glenn McCrory (born 1964), British professional boxer 
Helen McCrory (1968–2021), English actress
Mary Angeline Teresa McCrory (1893–1984), Irish religious sister
Milton McCrory (born 1962), American professional boxer 
Nick McCrory (born 1991), American diver 
Pat McCrory (born 1956), former governor of North Carolina (2013–2017), former mayor of Charlotte, North Carolina (1995–2009)
Sammy McCrory (1924–2011), Northern Ireland footballer 
Sam McCrory (loyalist) (born 1963), gay rights activist and former UDA activist
Steve McCrory (1964–2000), American amateur boxer 
Tamdan McCrory (born 1986), American mixed martial arts fighter

See also
McCrary (surname)
McCrorey (disambiguation)
McRory

Citations

References

Anglicised Irish-language surnames
Anglicised Scottish Gaelic-language surnames
Patronymic surnames
Surnames from given names